A Campaign and Adventure Guidebook for Middle-earth is a 1982 fantasy role-playing game supplement published by Iron Crown Enterprises.

Contents
A Campaign and Adventure Guidebook for Middle-earth is the first official material based on Tolkien's epic fantasies, and the first release in ICE's series of play aids for adventuring in Middle Earth.

Reception
William A. Barton reviewed A Campaign and Adventure Guidebook for Middle-earth in The Space Gamer No. 57. Barton commented that "Overall, the real usefulness of Middle Earth as a campaign aid will have to wait for subsequent modules in the series to be proven. Unless you're an absolute Tolkien fanatic and don't mind paying [...] you may want to hold off purchasing this one until others in the series are available for evaluation."

Jonathan Sutherland reviewed the Guidebook and Gridded Map for White Dwarf #50, giving it an overall rating of 6 out of 10, and stated that "The most useful section contains the trade routes, language areas and climate maps. Altogether, a useful package, if a little expensive, but  because of the beautifully reproduced map."

References

Middle-earth Role Playing supplements
Role-playing game supplements introduced in 1982